Daniel Kehlmann (born 13 January 1975) is a German-language novelist and playwright of both Austrian and German nationality. 

His novel Die Vermessung der Welt (translated into English by Carol Brown Janeway as Measuring the World, 2006) is the best selling book in the German language since Patrick Süskind's Perfume was released in 1985. In an ironic way, it deals with Alexander von Humboldt, one of the world's best-known naturalists of the 18th and 19th centuries, and Humboldt's relationship with the mathematician Carl Friedrich Gauss. According to The New York Times, it was the world's second-best selling novel in 2006. 

All his subsequent novels reached the number one spot on Germany's Spiegel bestseller list and were translated into English. He collaborated with Jonathan Franzen and  Paul Reitter on  Franzen's 2013 book The Kraus Project. Kehlmann's play The Mentor, translated by Christopher Hampton, opened at Theatre Royal, Bath, in April 2017 starring F. Murray Abraham and transferred to the London West End in July 2017. In October 2017, his play Christmas Eve, also translated by Christopher Hampton, premiered at the Theatre Royal. His novella You Should Have Left (2016) was adapted into a movie starring Kevin Bacon and Amanda Seyfried. Kehlmann's highly praised novel Tyll (2017), which sold more than 600.000 copies in German alone and was published in the US in February 2020, is currently being adapted into a TV series for Netflix by the makers of Dark. The novel was shortlisted for the 2020 International Booker Prize. Kehlmann's play Die Reise der Verlorenen was adapted for BBC radio by Tom Stoppard under the title The Voyage of the St. Louis.

Life and career
Kehlmann was born in Munich, the son of the television director Michael Kehlmann and the actress Dagmar Mettler. His family moved to his father's hometown Vienna at the age of six. His paternal grandparents were born Jewish, and his father was in a concentration camp during WWII. Kehlmann currently lives in New York City and Berlin.

Since 2015, Kehlmann has held the Eberhard Berent Chair at New York University. He is a member of the Deutsche Akademie für Sprache und Dichtung.

2016–2017 he was a fellow at the New York Public Library's Cullman Center for Writers and Scholars.

The novel Tyll was shortlisted for the International Booker Prize.

Kehlmann also works as a screenwriter and wrote the script for the TV film Das letzte Problem. He adapted Thomas Mann's novel Confessions of Felix Krull Confidence Man for an upcoming movie.

Awards and honors
2006 Kleist Prize
2007 WELT Literaturpreis
2007 Grand Prix du livre des dirigeants
2008 Thomas-Mann-Preis
2008 PO Enquist Pris
2010 Prix Cévennes du roman européen
2012 Nestroy Theatre Prize, Best play – Authors prize for Geister in Princeton
2018 Friedrich-Hölderlin-Preis
2018 Frank-Schirrmacher-Preis
2019 Anton Wildgans Prize
2019 Schubart Literaturpreis
2021 Elisabeth-Langgässer-Literaturpreis

Bibliography

Novels 

 Beerholms Vorstellung (1997).
 Unter der Sonne (1998).
 Mahlers Zeit (1999).
 Der fernste Ort (2001).
Ich und Kaminski (2003). Me and Kaminski, translated by Carol Brown Janeway (Pantheon, 2008).
 Die Vermessung der Welt (2005). Measuring the World, translated by Carol Brown Janeway (Pantheon, 2006).
 Requiem für einen Hund (2008).
 Leo Richters Porträt (2009).
 Ruhm. Ein Roman in neun Geschichten (2009). Fame. A Novel in Nine Stories, translated by Carol Brown Janeway (Pantheon, 2010).
 Lob: Über Literatur (2010).
 F. (2013). F. A Novel. Translated by Carol Brown Janeway (Pantheon, 2014).
 Du hättest gehen sollen (2016). You Should Have Left, translated by Ross Benjamin (Pantheon, 2016).
 Tyll (2017). Tyll, translated by Ross Benjamin (Pantheon, 2020).

Plays 
Geister in Princeton (2013).
Der Mentor (2014). The Mentor, translated by Christopher Hampton (Faber and Faber, 2017).
Heilig Abend (2017). Christmas Eve, translated by Christopher Hampton (Faber and Faber, 2017).
 Die Reise der Verlorenen (2018)

Filmography
Unter der Sonne (directed by Baran Bo Odar, 2006; short story)
 (Isabel Kleefeld, 2012; novel)
Measuring the World (Detlev Buck, 2012; novel and screenplay)
Me and Kaminski (Wolfgang Becker, 2015; novel)
Das letzte Problem (Karl Markovics, 2019; screenplay)
You Should Have Left (David Koepp, 2020; novel)
Verhör in der Nacht (Matti Geschonneck, 2020; screenplay, based on Kehlmann's stageplay Christmas Eve)
Bekenntnisse des Hochstaplers Felix Krull (Detlev Buck, 2021; screenplay)
Nebenan (Daniel Brühl, 2021; screenplay)

References

External links 
 
 James Wood reviews Daniel Kehlmann's novel Tyll, The New Yorker, February 2020
 Daniel Kehlmann profile, New York Times, February 2020
 Jonathan Franzen interviews Daniel Kehlmann, Salon, August 2014
 The Kraus Project: A Talk by Jonathan Franzen, Daniel Kehlmann, and Paul Reitter. October 2014
 Reading Daniel Kehlmann , by Arnon Grunberg. Words Without Borders, 6 April 2009
 "Humboldt's Gift", The Nation, 30 April 2007.
 Daniel Kehlmann Profile, Guardian, November 2014
 Q & A with Daniel Kehlmann, Financial Times, October 24, 2014

1975 births
Living people
20th-century German novelists
21st-century German novelists
20th-century Austrian novelists
21st-century Austrian novelists
German male novelists
Austrian male writers
Magic realism writers
Academic staff of Johannes Gutenberg University Mainz
German people of Austrian-Jewish descent
Kleist Prize winners
Anton Wildgans Prize winners
20th-century German male writers
21st-century German male writers